Team MTN–Qhubeka was a South African professional cycling team, which competed in elite road bicycle racing events such as the UCI Women's Road World Cup.

Major wins
2008 
Stage 4 Tour of Chongming Island, Cherise Taylor

National and continental champions
2008
 African Road Race, Cashandra Slingerland
 African Time Trial, Cashandra Slingerland
 South Africa Road Race, Cherise Taylor
 South Africa Time Trial, Marissa van der Merwe
2009
 African Time Trial, Cashandra Slingerland
 South Africa Time Trial, Cashandra Slingerland
2010
 African Road Race, Lylanie Lauwrens
 African Time Trial, Lylanie Lauwrens
 South Africa Time Trial, Cashandra Slingerland

References

Cycling teams based in South Africa
UCI Women's Teams
Cycling teams established in 2008
Cycling teams disestablished in 2012
2008 establishments in South Africa
2012 disestablishments in South Africa